Rashid Yassin Abbas Al-Rabaie (Arabic:رشيد ياسين)(July 1, 1931 - April 30, 2012) was an Iraqi journalist, poet, literary critic and university professor. He was born in Baghdad and completed his primary and secondary education. He then pursued a bachelor's degree in theatre science in Bulgaria and obtained a postgraduate degree in philosophy and aesthetics from the University of Sofia. He engaged in national politics from the beginning of the 1950s and lived in Syria as a political refugee from 1955 to 1958. He worked in the Baghari press and then in the literary posture magazine and Syrian soldier and dramatic consultation, and then as an art adviser in the cinema and theatre department in Iraq. Then a consultant for the Arabic Horizon magazine. He began publishing his poems since the mid-1940s and was one of the first to renew the rhythm and structure of the Arabic poem. His poetry was neglected papers 1972 and death in the desert 1986 and the sad doll. Iraq left for Yemen in 1997 as a professor at Sana 'a University and then in 2004 To the United States is a professor of Arabic at the University of Michigan–Dearborn. He lived in St. Louis, died in it and was buried in Lemay, Park Lone Cemetery.

Early life 
Rashid Yassin Abbas was born in Baghdad on 1 July 1931 or 7 January 1929 and his exact date of birth is unknown, the eldest of six children. His father was a Shia, a Rabi 'a clan and a good digger who pursued many businesses, including importing household goods. Rashid Yassin completed his primary and secondary school in Baghdad. A distant relative of his was a government minister, and his family was encouraged to attend law school and get a government job. But he knew from high school that he had a knack for poetry and resigned from law school in his second year. During this period, he began his political activity and joined the demonstrations, participating in Iraq's national opposition against Britain.

Rashid Yassin then went to Syria, where he worked in literary and political journalism. He met there with Mohammed Mahdi al-Jawahiri. He also met his first wife. He returned home after the 1958 Iraqi Revolution, which overthrew Iraq's Hashemite monarchy. He left Iraq in 1961. Two years later, the Baath Party seized the Iraqi Government. He continued his education in Bulgaria, completed his higher studies at the Institute of Performing Arts in Sofia in 1969 and was awarded the equivalent of a master's degree from the Institute itself in 1971. He received his doctorate in philosophical sciences from the University of Sofia. He did not rely on the Bulgarian Communist Party.

He moved to Syria, where he and his wife were divorced and then to Beirut. He left Lebanon in 1976 when the civil war erupted. He then returned to Iraq, remarried. He later returned to Bulgaria to finish his doctorate after the fall of the communist regime.

Career 
He began his media career from the Popular Front newspaper in 1950 and became responsible for the literary page of al-Naba 'al-Baghdadi daily newspaper the following year. He worked in the Syrian Soldier magazine from 1956 until the revolution of July 14, 1958. He worked as a translator and broadcaster on Sophia Radio Bulgaria during 1963-1969. He was editor of the Literary Attitude Magazine of the Arab Writers' Union of Damascus during 1972-1973. He was a literary critic of the Lebanese newspaper The Editor during 1973-1976. He served as Chairman of the Cultural Section of the Beirut Newspaper from 1974 until 1976. He served as Head of the Cultural Section of the University Newspaper of the Ministry of Higher Education in 1989.

In the Cultural and Artistic Department, Rashid Yassin served as Chief of the Research and Theatre Documentation Section of the State Foundation for Cinema and Theatre in Baghdad from 1976 to 1980. The Foundation's dramatic consultation became until 1983. He became technical adviser to the Film and Theatre Foundation until 1985. He was an adviser to the Public Foundation for Cultural Affairs from 1985 to 1988.

Iraq then left Yemen from 1997 to 2004 and was appointed Professor of Arab Literature at Sana 'a University. He worked as a professor of Arabic at the American University of Michigan (Dearborn) in 2005 and then referred himself to retirement.

He was a member of the Union of Iraqi Writers and an honorary member of the Union of Lebanese Literature, attended a number of literary conferences held in the country, and had debates in the literary press on the theory of art and theatre.

Death 
Rachid Abbas Yassin died on 30 April 2012 at his home in Santran West End, St. Louis, and was buried in Limai, Park Lone Cemetery, Missouri. His son, Dr. Nabil Yassin of St. Louis, said that in 2009 he had been diagnosed with progressive supranuclear palsy.

His work 
He translated literary works and studies from English and Bulgarian into Arabic. He published his poetry and studies in Iraqi and Arab newspapers and magazines, as well as translations, theoretical studies and critical articles in literature, theatre and aesthetics. Some of his works are:

 Discarded Papers, Poetry Collection, Arab Writers' Union of Damascus, 1972.
 Death in the desert, poetry collection, about the House of Cultural Affairs in Baghdad, 1986.
 From Ulysses Papers in the Journey of Loss, Poetry Collection, Lebanese Khayal House in Beirut, 2002.
 Invitation to Self-Awareness, Critical Studies and Articles in Theatre, Arab Writers' Union in Damascus, 2000
 Knight of Death, Poetry Group, Ayadi Center for Studies and Publishing in Sana 'a, 2004.
 Fox that lost its tail, critical studies in poetry and poetry, Abadi Center for Studies and Publishing in Sana 'a, 2004.

References 

2012 deaths
1929 births
Iraqi emigrants to Lebanon
Iraqi emigrants to Syria
Iraqi emigrants to Yemen
Iraqi emigrants to the United States
Translators from Bulgarian
Iraqi translators
21st-century Iraqi poets
20th-century Iraqi poets
Sofia University alumni
People from Baghdad
1931 births
Date of birth uncertain
Iraqi literary critics